The effects of climate change on the water cycle are profound and have been described as an "intensification" or an overall "strengthening" of the water cycle (also called hydrologic cycle). This effect has been observed since at least 1980. One example is the intensification of heavy precipitation events. This has important knock-on effects on the availability of freshwater resources, as well as other water reservoirs such as oceans, ice sheets, atmosphere and land surface. The water cycle is essential to life on earth and plays a large role in the global climate and the ocean circulation. The warming of the earth is expected to cause changes in the water cycle for various reasons. For example, warmer atmosphere can contain more water vapor which has effects on evaporation and rainfall. Oceans play a large role as well, since they absorb 93% of heat. The increase in ocean heat content since 1971 has a big effect on the ocean as well as the cycle. To avoid further, or more extreme, changes to the water cycle, greenhouse gas emissions must be reduced. 

The underlying cause of the intensifying water cycle is the increased amount of greenhouse gases, which lead to a warmer atmosphere through the greenhouse effect. Physics dictates that saturation vapor pressure increases by 7% when temperature rises by 1 °C (as described in the Clausius-Clapeyron equation). 

The strength of the water cycle and its changes over time are of considerable interest, especially as the climate changes. The essence of the overall hydrological cycle is the evaporation of moisture in one place and the precipitation in other places. In particular, evaporation exceeds precipitation over the oceans, which allows moisture to be transported by the atmosphere onto land where precipitation exceeds evapotranspiration, and the runoff flows into streams and rivers and discharges into the ocean, completing the cycle. The water cycle is a key part of the energy cycle through the evaporative cooling at the surface and latent heating of the atmosphere, as atmospheric systems play a primary role in moving heat upward. 

If water is available extra heat goes mostly into evaporation, as it always does on the oceans, otherwise it goes into raising temperature. The availability of water plus the water holding capacity of the atmosphere, which increases proportionally with temperature increase, means that water plays a major role over the oceans and tropics, but much less over continents and the polar regions. It is why temperature increases dominate in the Arctic and on land.

Several characteristics of the water cycle have the potential to cause sudden (abrupt) changes of the water cycle. However, the likelihood that such changes will occur during the 21st century is currently regarded as low.

Causes 

Global warming leads to changes in the global water cycle. These include first and foremost an increased water vapor pressure in the atmosphere. This causes changes in precipitation patterns with regards to frequency and intensity, as well as changes in groundwater and soil moisture. Taken together, these changes are often referred to as an "intensification and acceleration" of the water cycle. Key processes that will also be affected are droughts and floods, tropical cyclones, glaciers and snow cover and extreme weather events.

The increased amount of greenhouse gases in the atmosphere leads to a warmer atmosphere. The saturation vapor pressure of air increases with temperature, which means that warmer air can contain more water vapor. Because the air can contain more moisture, the evaporation is enhanced. As a consequence, the increased amount of water in the atmosphere leads to more intense rainfall. 

This relation between temperature and saturation vapor pressure is described in the Clausius–Clapeyron equation, which states that saturation pressure will increase by 7% when temperature rises by 1 °C. This is visible in measurements of the tropospheric water vapor, which are provided by satellites, radiosondes and surface stations. The IPCC AR5 concludes that tropospheric water vapor has increased by 3.5% the recent 40 years, which is consistent with the observed temperature increase of 0.5 °C.

Observations and predictions 
Since the middle of the 20th century, human-caused climate change has resulted in observable changes in the global water cycle. The IPCC Sixth Assessment Report in 2021 predicted that these changes will continue to grow significantly at the global and regional level. These findings are a continuation of scientific consensus expressed in the IPCC Fifth Assessment Report from 2007 and other special reports by the Intergovernmental Panel on Climate Change which had already stated that the water cycle will continue to intensify throughout the 21st century.

The report also found that: Precipitation over land has increased since 1950, and the rate of increase has become faster since the 1980s. Water vapour in the atmosphere (in particular the troposhere) has increased since at least the 1980s. It is expected that over the course of the 21st century, the annual global precipitation over land will increase due to a higher global surface temperature.

The human influence on the water cycle can be observed by analysing the ocean's surface salinity and the "precipitation minus evaporation (P–E)" patterns over the ocean. Both are elevated. Research published in 2012 based on surface ocean salinity over the period 1950 to 2000 confirm this projection of an intensified global water cycle with salty areas becoming more saline and fresher areas becoming more fresh over the period.

A warming climate makes extremely wet and very dry occurrences more severe. There can also be changes in atmospheric circulation patterns. This will affect the regions and frequency for these extremes to occur. In most parts of the world and under all emission scenarios, water cycle variability and accompanying extremes are anticipated to rise more quickly than the changes of average values.

Changes to regional weather patterns 
Regional weather patterns across the globe are also changing due to tropical ocean warming. The Indo-Pacific warm pool has been warming rapidly and expanding during the recent decades, largely in response to increased carbon emissions from fossil fuel burning. The warm pool expanded to almost double its size, from an area of 22 million km2 during 1900–1980, to an area of 40 million km2 during 1981–2018. This expansion of the warm pool has altered global rainfall patterns, by changing the life cycle of the Madden Julian Oscillation (MJO), which is the most dominant mode of weather fluctuation originating in the tropics.

Potential for abrupt change 
Several characteristics of the water cycle have the potential to cause sudden (abrupt) changes of the water cycle. The definition for "abrupt change" is: a regional to global scale change in the climate system that happens more quickly than it has in the past, indicating that the climate response is not linear. There may be "rapid transitions between wet and dry states" as a result of non-linear interactions between the ocean, atmosphere, and land surface. 

For example, a collapse of the Atlantic meridional overturning circulation (AMOC), if it did occur, could have large regional impacts on the water cycle. The initiation or termination of solar radiation modification could also result in abrupt changes in the water cycle.There could also be abrupt water cycle responses to changes in the land surface: Amazon deforestation and drying, greening of the Sahara and the Sahel, amplification of drought by dust are all processes which could contribute. 

The scientific understanding of the likelihood of such abrupt changes to the water cycle is not yet clear. Sudden changes in the water cycle due to human activity are a possibility that cannot be ruled out, with current scientific knowledge. However, the likelihood that such changes will occur during the 21st century is currently regarded as low.

Measurement and modelling techniques

Intermittency in precipitation 
Climate models do not simulate the water cycle very well. One reason is that precipitation is a difficult quantity to deal with because it is inherently intermittent. Often, only the average amount is considered. People tend to use the term "precipitation" as if it was the same as "precipitation amount". What actually matters when describing changes to Earth's precipitation patterns is more than just the total amount: it is also about the intensity (how hard it rains or snows), frequency (how often), duration (how long), and type (whether rain or snow). New Zealand climatologist Kevin E. Trenberth has researched the characteristics of precipitation and found that it is the frequency and intensity that matter for extremes, and those are difficult to calculate in climate models.

Changes in ocean salinity 

Due to global warming and increased glacier melt, thermohaline circulation patterns may be altered by increasing amounts of freshwater released into oceans and, therefore, changing ocean salinity. Thermohaline circulation is responsible for bringing up cold, nutrient-rich water from the depths of the ocean, a process known as upwelling.

Seawater consists of fresh water and salt, and the concentration of salt in seawater is called salinity. Salt does not evaporate, thus the precipitation and evaporation of freshwater influences salinity strongly. Changes in the water cycle are therefore strongly visible in surface salinity measurements, which is already acknowledged since the 1930s.

The advantage of using surface salinity is that it is well documented in the last 50 years, for example with in-situ measurement systems as ARGO. Another advantage is that oceanic salinity is stable on very long time scales, which makes small changes due to anthropogenic forcing easier to track. The oceanic salinity is not homogeneously distributed over the globe, there are regional differences that show a clear pattern. The tropic regions are relatively fresh, since these regions are dominated by rainfall. The subtropics are more saline, since these are dominated by evaporation, these regions are also known as the 'desert latitudes'. The latitudes close to the polar regions are then again less saline, with the lowest salinity values found in these regions. This is because there is a low amount of evaporation in this region, and a high amount of fresh meltwater entering the ocean.

The long term observation records show a clear trend: the global salinity patterns are amplifying in this period. This means that the high saline regions have become more saline, and regions of low salinity have become less saline. The regions of high salinity are dominated by evaporation, and the increase in salinity shows that evaporation is increasing even more. The same goes for regions of low salinity that are become less saline, which indicates that precipitation is intensifying only more. This spatial pattern is similar to the spatial pattern of evaporation minus precipitation. The amplification of the salinity patterns is therefore indirect evidence for an intensifying water cycle.

To further investigate the relation between ocean salinity and the water cycle, models play a large role in current research. General Circulation Models (GCMs) and more recently Atmosphere-Ocean General Circulation Models (AOGCMs) simulate the global circulations and the effects of changes such as an intensifying water cycle. The outcome of multiple studies based on such models support the relationship between surface salinity changes and the amplifying precipitation minus evaporation patterns.

A metric to capture the difference in salinity between high and low salinity regions in the top 2000 meters of the ocean is captured in the SC2000 metric. The observed increase of this metric is 5.2% (±0.6%) from 1960 to 2017. But this trend is accelerating, as it increased 1.9% (±0.6%) from 1960 to 1990, and 3.3% (±0.4%) from 1991 to 2017. Amplification of the pattern is weaker below the surface. This is because ocean warming increases near-surface stratification, subsurface layer is still in equilibrium with the colder climate. This causes the surface amplification to be stronger than older models predicted.

An instrument carried by the SAC-D satellite Aquarius, launched in June 2011, measured global sea surface salinity.

Between 1994 and 2006, satellite observations showed an 18% increase in the flow of freshwater into the world's oceans, partly from melting ice and partly from increased precipitation driven by an increase in global ocean evaporation.

Salinity evidence for changes in the water cycle 
Essential processes of the water cycle are precipitation and evaporation. The local amount of precipitation minus evaporation (often noted as P-E) shows the local influence of the water cycle. Changes in the magnitude of P-E are often used to show changes in the water cycle. But robust conclusions about changes in the amount of precipitation and evaporation are complex. About 85% of the earth's evaporation and 78% of the precipitation happens over the ocean surface, where measurements are difficult. Precipitation on the one hand, only has long term accurate observation records over land surfaces where the amount of rainfall can be measured locally (called in-situ). Evaporation on the other hand, has no long time accurate observation records at all. This prohibits confident conclusions about changes since the industrial revolution. The AR5 (Fifth Assessment Report) of the IPCC creates an overview of the available literature on a topic, and labels the topic then on scientific understanding. They assign only low confidence to precipitation changes before 1951, and medium confidence after 1951, because of the scarcity of data. These changes are attributed to human influence, but only with medium confidence as well.

Convection-permitting models to predict weather extremes 
The representation of convection in climate models has so far restricted the ability of scientists to accurately simulate African weather extremes, limiting climate change predictions. Convection-permitting models (CPMs) are able to better simulate the diurnal cycle of tropical convection, the vertical cloud structure and the coupling between moist convection and convergence and soil moisture-convection feedbacks in the Sahel. The benefits of CPMs have also been demonstrated in other regions, including a more realistic representation of the precipitation structure and extremes. A convection-permitting (4.5 km grid-spacing) model over an Africa-wide domain shows future increases in dry spell length during the wet season over western and central Africa. The scientists concludes that, with the more accurate representation of convection, projected changes in both wet and dry extremes over Africa may be more severe. In other words: "both ends of Africa’s weather extremes will get more severe".

Impacts on water management aspects 

The human-caused changes to the water cycle will increase hydrologic variability and therefore have a profound impact on the water sector and investment decisions. They will affect water availability (water resources), water supply, water demand, water security and water allocation at regional, basin, and local levels.

Water security

Water scarcity

Droughts

Floods

Groundwater quantity and quality

See also 
 Effects of climate change
 Effects of climate change on oceans

References 

Effects of climate change
Forms of water
Hydrology